The 2020–21 Turkcell Women's Football League is the 25th season of Turkey's premier women's footballleague. The league, formerly called the Turkish Women's First Football League, was renamed to Turkscell Women's Football League after a sponsorship agreement was signed on 8 March 2021, the International Women's Day, between the Turkish Football Federation and the mobile phone operator Turkcell. The 2020–21 season was dedicated to  healthcare Workers and was officially named().

Due to ongoing COVID-19 pandemic in Turkey, the regular season, which is used to start in the Fall and to conclude in the next year's Spring, was postponed to Spring with changed competition format. The 2020–21 season starts on 17 April and ends on 5 May. The number of participating teams increased to 16, including all the 12 teams from the 2019-20 First League season and additional 4 top teams promoted from the 2019-20 Second League season. The 16 teams are divided in four groups of four teams. Each of the four promoted Second-League teams are assigned to one group. Each team in a group plays three matches  in total. The first two top teams of each group are qualified for quarterfinals in a single-elimination tournament. The team winning the final match will represent Turkey at the 2021–22 UEFA Women's Champions League .

Teams

Team changes

Qualifying stage
All matches of the four groups are played at the Emirhan Sport Complex in Manavgat district of Antalya Province between 17 and 24 April 2021.

Group A

Group B

Group C

Group D

Knockout stage

Honours
The Turkish Football Federation awarded following sportspeople for the league season following the final match.
 Top goalscorer: Zelal Baturay of Fatih Vatan Spor (7 goals),
 Best goalkeeper: Fatma Şahin of Beşiktaş J.K.,
 Most valuable player: Cansu Nur Kaya of Fatih Vatan Spor,
 Best manager: Efe Mehmet Aydın of Fatih Vatan Spor.

Additionally, the referees of the final matches, Melis Özçiğdem, Deybet Gök , Betül Nur Yılmaz, Cansu Tiryaki and Özlem Yapaklar  as well as the organizers Dr. Esin Nur Taşdemir and Dr. İsmail Başöz were honored with a plaque.

Top goalscorers
.

Hat-tricks and more

References

2019
2020–21 domestic women's association football leagues
Women's First League
Turkish Women's First Football League, 2021
2021